Jewtown, also known as North Heilwood, is an unincorporated community within Pine Township, Indiana County, Pennsylvania, United States. It is located near the southerly intersection of Pennsylvania Routes 403 and 553. The town has met several times and determined its name not to be derogatory.

References

External links
North Heilwood (Jewtown) – The Early History of Heilwood

Unincorporated communities in Indiana County, Pennsylvania
Unincorporated communities in Pennsylvania